Sharza is a rural locality (an ulus) in Okinsky District, Republic of Buryatia, Russia. The population was 33 as of 2010.

Geography 
Sharza is located 41 km northwest of Orlik (the district's administrative centre) by road. Borik is the nearest rural locality.

References 

Rural localities in Okinsky District